Symbrenthia niphanda, the bluetail jester, is a species of nymphalid butterfly found in South Asia. (Kashmir, Assam, Yunnan)

References

Nymphalini
Butterflies of Asia
Butterflies described in 1872
Taxa named by Frederic Moore